Palla is a surname. Notable people with the surname include:
 Eduard Palla (1864 – 1922), Austrian botanist and mycologist of Moravian descent
 Maria Antónia Palla (born 1933), Portoguese journalist, writer and feminist
 Stephan Palla (born 1989), professional footballer

See also 

 Palla (disambiguation)
 Pala (surname)